Bangladesh National Film Award for Best Child Artist  is one of the most prestigious film awards given in Bangladesh. Since 1977, awards have been given in the category of Child Artist. Master Adnan was the first awardee of this category for child artist of the film Megher Okek Rong in 1976. Three times this award achieved by Prarthona Fardeen Dighi and Azad Rahman Shakil also gained two times.

List of winners
Key

Special Category

Records and statistics

Multiple wins
The following individuals received two or more Best Child awards:

See also
 Bangladesh National Film Award for Best Actor
 Bangladesh National Film Award for Best Actress
 Bangladesh National Film Award for Best Supporting Actor
 Bangladesh National Film Award for Best Supporting Actress
 Bangladesh National Film Award for Best Performance in a Negative Role
 Bangladesh National Film Award for Best Performance in a Comic Role

Notes

References

Sources

 
 
 
 
 
 

Child Artist
 
Film awards for Best Cast